Janak Champika Gamage (born April 17, 1964, in Matara) is a former Sri Lankan cricketer who played four ODIs for Sri Lanka in 1995.

Coaching career
Since his retirement, Gamage has taken up coaching. He coached the Bangladesh women's national team from August 2014 to May 2016, and was then hired to coach the Thailand women's national team.

References

1964 births
Living people
Colts Cricket Club cricketers
Galle Cricket Club cricketers
Kurunegala Youth Cricket Club cricketers
Moors Sports Club cricketers
Ruhuna cricketers
Sri Lankan cricket coaches
Sri Lankan cricketers
Sri Lankan expatriates in Bangladesh
Sri Lankan expatriates in Thailand
Sri Lanka One Day International cricketers